Sarah Richardson (born 1971) is a Canadian TV host and interior designer.

Sarah or Sara or similar, surnamed Richardson, may also refer to:

Sarah Katherine Richardson, known as Katy Richardson (1854–1927), British mountain climber
Sarah Richardson, British politician, Lord Mayor of Westminster, wife of Damian Collins
Sarah Richardson, musician in The Creeping Nobodies
 Sara Thomas (born 1941, nee Richardson), U.S. politician

See also
 Richardson (surname)
 Sarah (given name)